Charles Clay may refer to:

 Charles Clay (American football) (born 1989), American football fullback and tight end
 Charles Clay (surgeon) (1801–1893), English surgeon
 Sir Charles Travis Clay (1885–1978), English antiquary and librarian